Pallas's could refer to any of the following animals, named after the biologist Peter Pallas:

Birds

 Pallas's cormorant 
 Pallas's fish-eagle
 Pallas's gull
 Pallas's grasshopper warbler
 Pallas's leaf warbler
 Pallas's reed bunting
 Pallas's rosefinch
 Pallas's sandgrouse

Mammals

 Pallas's long-tongued bat
 Pallas's tube-nosed fruit bat 
 Pallas's cat
 Pallas's squirrel

Animal common name disambiguation pages